William F. Nelson (September 28, 1863 – June 23, 1941) was a starting pitcher in Major League Baseball who played for the Pittsburgh Alleghenys of the American Association. Nelson threw right-handed; his batting side is unknown. He was born in Terre Haute, Indiana.

Little is known about Nelson, who was 20 years old when he entered the majors on September 3, 1884. He posted a 4.50 ERA in three complete games and did not have a decision, giving up 13 earned runs on 26 hits and eight walks while striking out six in 26 innings of work. As a hitter, he went 2-for-12 (.167) with a run scored. He played his final game on September 10, and never appeared in a major league game again.

Nelson died in his native Terre Haute at age 77.

See also
1884 Pittsburgh Alleghenys season

External links
Baseball Reference
Retrosheet

Pittsburgh Alleghenys players
19th-century baseball players
Major League Baseball pitchers
Baseball players from Indiana
1863 births
1941 deaths
Toledo Avengers players
Lincoln Tree Planters players